HMS Destiny  (W 115) was a  of the Royal Navy during World War II.

Service history 
Destiny was laid down on 10 April 1942 at Defoe Shipbuilding Company in Bay City, Michigan, as BAT-9, launched 1 July 1942 and commissioned into the Royal Navy under Lend-Lease on 30 July 1942. She served through World War II and was returned to the United States Navy in Subic Bay on 13 June 1946 and struck on 8 May 1946. On 6 January 1948, she was sold to Moller on 6 January 1948 and renamed Frosty Moller. In 1950, she was renamed Christine Moller and sold in 1951 to a Dutch owner and renamed Oceanus. In 1953, she was again sold and renamed Gee Zee. After a decade, she was resold to Greek owners and renamed Atlas. Renamed Atlas II in 1976, her final disposition is unknown.

References 

1942 ships
Favourite-class tugboats
Ships built in Bay City, Michigan